Cypraea hungerfordi lovetha  is a species of sea snail, a marine gastropod mollusk in the family Cypraeidae.

Original description
    Poppe G.T., Tagaro S. & Buijse J. (2005) A new subspecies of Cypraea hungerfordi from Aliguay island, the Philippines. Visaya 1(4): 24-29. [April 2005.

References

External links
 Worms Link

Cypraeidae
Subspecies